Eydison Teofilo Soares, or simply Eydison (born May 30, 1988), is a Brazilian football player who plays as  a forward for Alagoinhas Atlético on loan from Azuriz Futebol Clube.

Club career

Azuriz Futebol Clube

On 20 September 2020, Eydison joined Azuriz for a season in Segunda Divisão. On 27 September 2020, he made his Azuriz debut, scoring one goal in a 1-1 vs Prudentópolis. On 11 October, he made the first assistant for Azuriz in a 1–0 home victory over Apucarana. On 18 October, he scored the second goal for the club on penalty in 1-1 vs São-Joseense. On 27 October, he scored the 3rd goal for Azuriz, a header to open a 2–1 home win also against Nacional(PR) in compensational match of round 2. On 16 November, he had 4th goal for the club, a close-range ball touching is equal to 1–1 in the 1–3 defeat to Maringá in round 8 of 9. On 25 November, he made a successful the first penalty after 2 draw games of Semi-Final vs Apucarana, in the 8–7 victory on penalty, Azuriz reach to Final. On 2 December, in the Second Leg at Willie Davids Stadium of Maringá, he scored first goal in the 3–0 away victory, so it means his club - Azuriz are the champion of Paranaense 2 season 2020, Azuriz and Maringá are also promoted to Primeira Divisão 2021.

On 14 January 2023, Eydison came back Azuriz for a season after 2 years played in Vietnam. On 13 February, he scored his first goal for club this season in a 2-0 home victory over Foz do Iguaçu, there was as the first winning game of club this season.

Than Quang Ninh

On 23 December 2020, Eydison come back Than Quang Ninh in 2021 V-league 1, this was the second time he joins Than Quang Ninh FC and the COVID-19 makes him 14 days to be isolated before training with team. On 17 January 2021, he had 2 goals for Than Quang Ninh in the first round of 2021 V.League 1 (82' minute and 90+4' minute) in 2–1 away win vs Hong Linh Ha Tinh FC although lose 0-1 when half-time. On 24 March, he scored the last goal of the 2–0 home victory game vs Thanh Hoa FC. On 28 March, he had 2 goals in the derby northeast of Vietnam vs Hải Phòng FC at Lach Tray Stadium. On 16 April, at Hang Day Stadium, he had the 6th goal for club in 2–1 away lost vs Viettel FC.

Becamex Binh Duong

January 2022, Eydison joined Becamex Binh Duong for a season in 2022 V-league 1. On 30 July, he had the first goal for club by a successful penalty kick, but his team lost 2-3 in home vs Binh Dinh FC. On 13 August, he had one goal in a 2–1 home victory vs Saigon FC. On 07 October, he had one goal in a 4-0 away victory vs SHB Da Nang FC, he didn't celebrate because of SHB Da Nang FC were his old team. On 23 October, he had the 4th for club by a successful penalty kick, his team draw 2-2 in home vs Hong Linh Ha Tinh FC. On 30 October, he had the 5th for club by a successful penalty kick, his team draw 1-1 in home vs Nam Dinh FC.

Alagoinhas Atlético Clube

March 2023, Eydison joined Alagoinhas Atlético, on loan from Azuriz.

Achievements

Club
Inter de Lages
Campeonato Catarinense de Futebol - Série B:
 Winners : 2014
Brusque
Campeonato Catarinense de Futebol - Série B:
 Winners : 2015
Azuriz Futebol Clube
Campeonato Paranaense de Futebol - Série B:
 Winners : 2020

References

External links

1988 births
Living people
Brazilian footballers
Brazilian expatriate footballers
Expatriate footballers in Mexico
Expatriate footballers in Japan
Expatriate footballers in Vietnam
Association football forwards
Campeonato Brasileiro Série A players
Campeonato Brasileiro Série C players
Campeonato Brasileiro Série D players
J2 League players
Adap Galo Maringá Football Club players
Associação Esportiva Recreativa Engenheiro Beltrão players
Grêmio Barueri Futebol players
Iraty Sport Club players
Americano Futebol Clube players
Treze Futebol Clube players
Matsumoto Yamaga FC players
Cianorte Futebol Clube players
Brusque Futebol Clube players
Club Necaxa footballers
Maringá Futebol Clube players
Sociedade Esportiva e Recreativa Caxias do Sul players
Esporte Clube Internacional de Lages players
Luverdense Esporte Clube players
SHB Da Nang FC players
Long An FC players
Al-Orobah FC players
Al Dhaid SC players
Than Quang Ninh FC players
Becamex Binh Duong FC players
Saudi First Division League players
UAE First Division League players
Expatriate footballers in Saudi Arabia
Expatriate footballers in the United Arab Emirates
Brazilian expatriate sportspeople in the United Arab Emirates
Brazilian expatriate sportspeople in Saudi Arabia